El Amra District is a district of Aïn Defla Province, Algeria.

Municipalities
The district is further divided into three municipalities.
El Amra
Mekhatria
Arib

Districts of Aïn Defla Province